The Light in Darkness is a 1917 American silent drama film directed by Alan Crosland and starring Shirley Mason, Frank Morgan and William H. Tooker.

Cast
 Shirley Mason as Hilary Kenyon 
 Frank Morgan as Ramsey Latham 
 William H. Tooker as Sheriff Brad Milligan 
 J. Frank Glendon as J. Arthur Converse 
 George S. Trimble as Governor of California 
 Bigelow Cooper as DeWitt Pierce 
 William Wadsworth as Sheriff Len Moody 
 Samuel N. Niblack as State Bank Examiner 
 Charles Martin as The Bank Teller

References

Bibliography
 Goble, Alan. The Complete Index to Literary Sources in Film. Walter de Gruyter, 1999.

External links

1917 films
1917 drama films
Silent American drama films
Films directed by Alan Crosland
American silent feature films
1910s English-language films
American black-and-white films
Edison Studios films
1910s American films